Sidi El Mekki is a small town and rural commune in Berrechid Province of the Casablanca-Settat region of Morocco. In the 2014 Moroccan census the commune recorded a population of 8920 people living in 1711 households. At the time of the 2004 census, the commune had a total population of 10,983 people living in 1793 households.

References

Populated places in Berrechid Province
Rural communes of Casablanca-Settat